Another Puff is a song co-written and recorded by American country artist Jerry Reed. It was released in January 1972 as the second and final single from the album, Ko-Ko Joe. The song reached peaks of number 27 on the U.S. country chart and number 65 on the Billboard Hot 100.

Content
The song discusses a man trying to stop smoking cigarettes.

Chart performance

References

1972 singles
Jerry Reed songs
Songs written by Jerry Reed
Song recordings produced by Chet Atkins